The Colin Roderick Award is presented annually by the Foundation for Australian Literary Studies at Queensland's James Cook University for "the best book published in Australia which deals with any aspect of Australian life". It was first presented in 1967 and has a prize of A$20,000. Starting in 1980, the H. T. Priestley Memorial Medal has also been bestowed upon the award winner.

The Award was founded by Colin Roderick, an Australian "writer, editor, academic and educator".

Award winners 
 2022: Emily Bitto, Wild Abandon
 2021: Sofie Laguna, Infinite Splendours
2020: Sally Young, Paper Emperors: The rise of Australia’s newspaper empires
 2019: Robert Drewe, The True Colour of the Sea
 2018: Jock Serong, On the Java Ridge
 2016: Josephine Wilson, Extinctions 
 2015: Gail Jones, A Guide to Berlin 
 2014: Michael Wilding, Wild Bleak Bohemia : Marcus Clarke, Adam Lindsay Gordon and Henry Kendall - A Documentary
 2013: Ashley Hay, The Railwayman's Wife & Stephen Edgar, Eldershaw
 2012: Thomas Keneally, The Daughters of Mars
 2011: Gillian Mears, Foal's Bread
 2010: Karen Kissane, Worst of Days: Inside the Black Saturday Firestorm
 2009: Michael Cathcart, The Water Dreamers
 2008: Graham Freudenberg, Churchill and Australia & James Boyce, Van Diemen's Land
 2007: Malcolm Knox, Jamaica
 2006: Deborah Robertson, Careless
 2005: Peter Temple, The Broken Shore
 2004: Alan Wearne, The Lovemakers & Tim Winton, The Turning
 2003: Thomas Keneally, The Tyrant's Novel
 2002: Don Watson, Recollections of a Bleeding Heart: A Portrait of Paul Keating PM
 2001: Peter Rose, Rose Boys
 2000: Peter Carey, True History of the Kelly Gang
 1999: Christopher Koch, Out of Ireland
 1998: Robert Dessaix, (And So Forth)
 1997: Peter Edwards, A Nation at War
 1996: Tim Flannery, Roger Martin and Alexandra Szalay, Illustrator Peter Schouten, Tree Kangaroos
 1995: Judy Cassab, Diaries
 1994: Patrick Buckridge, The Scandalous Penton: A Biography of Brian Penton
 1993: Cassandra Pybus, Gross Moral Turpitude: The Orr Case Reconsidered
 1992: Ruth Park, A Fence Around the Cuckoo
 1991: Joan Dugdale, Struggle of Memory
 1990: Roland Griffiths-Marsh, Sixpenny Soldier
 1989: Chris Symons, John Bishop: A Life for Music
 1988: Peter Carey, Oscar and Lucinda
 1987: Nancy Phelan, Home Is the Sailor and the Best of Intentions
 1986: Fr Tom Boland, James Duhig
 1985: John Gunn, The Defeat of Distance: Qantas 1919-1939
 1984: Alan Gould, The Man Who Stayed Below
 1983: Dudley McCarthy, Gallipoli to the Somme
 1982: Geoffrey Serle, John Monash: A Biography
 1981: Gavin Souter, A Company of Heralds
 1980: Allan Grocott, Convicts, Clergymen and Churches
 1979: Thea Astley, Hunting the Wild Pineapple
 1978: Leslie Rees, History of Australian Drama
 1977: Alan Marshall, The Complete Stories of Alan Marshall
 1976: Gavin Souter, Lion and Kangaroo
 1975: Denis Murphy, TJ Ryan
 1974: David Malouf, Neighbours in a Thicket : Poems
 1973: Dorothy Green, Ulysses Bound: Henry Handel Richardson and Her Fiction
 1972: Sir Keith Hancock, Discovering Monaro
 1971: Geoffrey Serle, The Rush to Be Rich
 1970: Margaret Lawrie, Myths and Legends of Torres Strait
 1969: Francis Webb, Collected Poems
 1968: Gavin Souter, A Peculiar People
 1967: Douglas Stewart, Collected Poems, 1936-1967

References

External links 
 

Australian literary awards
Awards established in 1967